Sanghol is a historical village located in Fatehgarh Sahib District of Punjab, India predating to Harrapan civilisation. It is also known as Uchha Pind Sanghol. It is about 40 km from Chandigarh on the way to Ludhiana and approximately 10 km from Dholewal. This place holds a special position on the archaeological atlas of India. Excavations at the site have yielded coins and seals related to Toramana and Mihirakula belonging to central Asia. A Buddhist stupa was excavated in 1968, but in February 1985 a rich treasure of 117 beautiful carved stone slabs, which includes 69 pillars, 35 crossbars, figures and figurines, was excavated by the experts of the Directorate of Archaeology, Punjab. Scholars have explained them as Kushan sculptures of the Mathura school of the 1st and 2nd centuries AD. These treasures have since been displayed for art lovers and historians in Sanghol Museum. Many of the art pieces from this museum often go on display as special exhibits at various museums around the world.

Situated on the top of a mound, Ucha Pind Sanghol is spread over an area of 200 km.

Museum

Sanghol is famed for the Sanghol Museum. It belongs to the civilisation of Harappan which is retained by the Archaeological Survey of India (ASI).It has various antiques that were discovered during the excavations at Sanghol. The various sculptures of stone are the eye catching attractions of the museum which are displayed in the Upper gallery. Maps, charts, photographs, graphs and drawings are arranged chronically. It displays art forms of Kushana period (extending between 2nd and 3rd century). A large of number of relics dating from the late Harappan civilization (1720  – 1300 BC) to 6th century AD is found here. More than 15000 artefacts were collected from this site and majority of them are displayed in this museum.

Sanghol also known as Uchha Pind is a famous village in the area. There are some mythical stories about the destruction of this village. The main village sits very high clearly visible from the surrounding towns. It is also linked to the Kissa "Roop Basant" stories as well. Some people from surrounding villages say that its ancient name was Sangla-deep.

There is a Buddhist Stupa and Monastery Complex dating back to 1st and 2nd century AD situated on the main road.

Gallery

References

Indus Valley civilisation sites
Fatehgarh Sahib
Villages in Fatehgarh Sahib district
Bara culture